Chris Cole (born January 17, 1964, in Huntersville, North Carolina) is a Libertarian Party activist in North Carolina. He has run unsuccessfully for a number of local, state, and federal offices. In 2008, it was thought that his candidacy might act as a spoiler in what was expected to be a close U.S. Senate race.

Early political career
In 1996, Cole unsuccessfully ran as a Libertarian for a seat in the North Carolina General Assembly against Jim Black in House District 36.

In 2001, Cole sought election to the District 4 seat on the Charlotte City Council, challenging incumbent Malcolm Graham. Graham was re-elected, with 6,976 votes to Cole's 762.

In 2002, Cole ran for the U.S. Congress in North Carolina's 9th congressional district. In that race, Republican Sue Myrick was re-elected with 72% of the vote to Democrat Ed McGuire's 26%. Cole received 3,374 votes, or 2%.

Cole again ran for the City Council in 2003, this time for one of four at-large seats; the other candidates were three Democrats and four Republicans, including one incumbent from each of the two major parties. Two Republicans and two Democrats, including both incumbents, won the four seats; Cole received 5,533 votes, less than any other candidate. The four winners received from 36,743 to 41,661 votes; after Cole, the worst-performing candidate received 24,468.

Cole was the Libertarian candidate for lieutenant governor in the 2004 election. Incumbent Democrat Beverly Perdue won re-election with 56% of the vote to Republican Jim Snyder's 43%. Cole received 56,368 votes, or 2%.

2008 Senate race
In 2008, Cole ran for the U.S. Senate seat held by Republican Elizabeth Dole. When he entered the race, the Libertarian Party was not officially recognized by the state; rather than going through a primary, he had to secure signatures on a petition. One of his goals in running, he said, was to generate support for Libertarian presidential candidate Bob Barr and gubernatorial candidate Mike Munger; if either won more than 2% of the vote, the party would retain its recognition and would not need to gather signatures for the 2010 and 2012 elections.

Cole's platform included ending the Iraq War and abolishing the personal income tax. While Dole and Democratic challenger Kay Hagan insisted on the need for border security to deal with illegal immigration, Cole ascribed the problem to the minimum-wage law and other labor restrictions.

The race between Dole and Hagan was expected to be close, and it was suggested that Cole might influence the outcome by taking a small but significant share of votes from one of the major-party candidates. An August poll conducted by Public Policy Polling showed 42% of respondents supporting Hagan to 39% for Dole; Cole was the choice of 5%. Another survey indicated that Cole was drawing support of 6–7%. In late October, a new Public Policy Polling survey showed Hagan leading Dole 48–45%, with Cole chosen by 4%. According to Cole, his candidacy would draw support from both the Republican and the Democrat, although slightly more from the former: fiscal conservatives dissatisfied with the Bush administration would choose him over Dole, while voters alienated by Hagan's opposition to same-sex marriage and by what Cole called her "immigrant-bashing" might transfer their support to him.

When the election was held, the race proved much less close than expected. Hagan defeated Dole with 53% of the vote to 44%; Cole received 133,430 votes, or 3%.

After 2008

In 2016, Cole ran as a Libertarian for the 41st District seat in the North Carolina Senate.  He challenged incumbent Jeff Tarte, a Republican who had held the seat since 2012.  Tarte won the election, with 55,155 votes, or 55% of the total; Democrat Jonathan Hudson received 41,214 votes, or 41%; and Cole received 4,894 votes, or 5%.

References

1964 births
Living people
North Carolina Libertarians
Politicians from Charlotte, North Carolina
People from Huntersville, North Carolina